or  is a lake in the municipality of Grane in Nordland county, Norway.  The  lake lies just west of Børgefjell National Park in southern Grane.  The village of Majavatn lies on the eastern shore of the lake.  European route E6 and the Nordland Line both run along the eastern shore of the lake.

See also
 List of lakes in Norway
 Geography of Norway

References

Lakes of Nordland
Grane, Nordland